Love Marriage is a 1975 Indian Malayalam film,  directed by Hariharan and produced by G. P. Balan. The film stars Prem Nazir, Jayabharathi, Adoor Bhasi and Jose Prakash in the lead roles. The film had musical score by Ahuan Sebastian. This is the first movie of T. Damodaran master as a writer.

Cast

Prem Nazir as Madhu
Jayabharathi as Manju
Adoor Bhasi as Menon
Jose Prakash as Prakash
Manavalan Joseph as Doctor
Pattom Sadan
Sankaradi as Major Nair
Sreelatha Namboothiri
Azhikkode Balan as Badran
Bahadoor as Gopi
K. P. Ummer as Raju
Meena as Mini/Meenakshiyamma
Rani Chandra as Viji
Reena
Sadhana as Kaanchi
T. S. Muthaiah as R. K. Nair
T. P. Madhavan as Police Officer
Sreekala (Rathidevi)
Swapna Ravi  as Stage Artist
Treesa
Vijaya

Soundtrack
The music was composed by Ahuan Sebastian and the lyrics were written by Mankombu Gopalakrishnan.

References

External links
 

1975 films
1970s Malayalam-language films
Films directed by Hariharan